Snooker world ranking points 2010/2011: The official world ranking points for the 97 professional snooker players in the 2010–11 season are listed below. The total points from the 2008/2009 and 2009/2010 seasons were used to determine the rankings at the start of 2010/2011 season. The rankings set the official seedings at the start of the season and at three further points during the season. The total points accumulated by the cut-off dates for the revised seedings were based on all the points from the current season, all of the points from the 2009/2010 season, and the points that were still valid from the 2008/2009 season. The total points from the 2009/2010 and 2010/2011 seasons were used to determine the seedings at the start of the 2011/2012 season.

The first seedings update took place on 4 October 2010, after the Brugge Open, and points accumulated from the Northern Ireland Trophy, Shanghai Masters and Grand Prix during the 2008/2009 season were dropped. The seedings were next updated on 13 December 2010, after the UK Championship; the points accumulated from the Bahrain Championship and UK Championship during the 2008/2009 season were dropped. The final update occurred on 21 February 2011, after the Welsh Open, and the points accumulated from the Welsh Open during the 2008/2009 season were dropped.

Seeding revisions

Ranking points
{| class="wikitable sortable" style="text-align: center;"
|-
! rowspan="2" scope=col class=unsortable | No.
! rowspan="2" scope=col width="35pt" class=unsortable |  Ch 
! rowspan="2" scope=col width="200pt" | Player 
! colspan="2" class="unsortable"| Season
! colspan="8" class="unsortable"| Tournaments
! class="unsortable"| Season
! colspan="3" class="unsortable"| Cut-off points
! rowspan="2" scope=col | Total 
|-
! scope=col | 08/09
! scope=col | 09/10
! scope=col | PTC
! scope=col | SM
! scope=col | WOO
! scope=col | UK
! scope=col | GM
! scope=col | WEO
! scope=col | CO
! scope=col | WC
! scope=col | 10/11
! scope=col | 
! scope=col | 
! scope=col | 
|-

|}

Notes

Sources

References

External links 
 2010/11 Official Rankings (Revision One) at Pro Snooker Blog
 2010/11 Official Rankings (Revision Two) at Pro Snooker Blog
 2010/11 Official Rankings (Revision Three) at Pro Snooker Blog
 2010/11 Official Rankings (End of Season) at Pro Snooker Blog

2010
Ranking points 2011
Ranking points 2010